Pultenaea patellifolia, commonly known as Mt Byron bush-pea, is a species of flowering plant in the family Fabaceae and is endemic to the Black Range in the Grampians National Park in Victoria. It is a spreading shrub with round leaves, and  clusters of yellow and red, pea-like flowers.

Description
The fruit is a pod surrounded by the remains of the sepals.

Taxonomy and naming
Pultenaea patellifolia was first formally described in 1921 by Herbert Bennett Williamson in the Proceedings of the Royal Society of Victoria from specimens collected near Mount William.

Distribution and habitat
This pultenaea grows in the heath understorey of forest and is mostly confined to the Black Range in the Grampians.

References

patellifolia
Flora of Victoria (Australia)
Plants described in 1921